The Curt Stern Award, also known as the Stern Award, honors the memory of Curt Stern (1902–1981) as an outstanding and pioneering human geneticist. Established in 2001, this award is presented annually by the American Society of Human Genetics (ASHG) for outstanding scientific achievements in human genetics that have occurred in the last 10 years.

Award recipients
Source: American Society of Human Genetics

See also

 List of genetics awards

References

External links
 Past ASHG Award Recipients

American science and technology awards
Awards established in 2001
Genetics awards